Nabil Baha (Arabic: نبيل باها; born 12 August 1981) is a retired footballer who played as a striker.

He started playing for Montpellier in 2000 and spent much of his career in the top divisions of Portugal and Spain, with notable stints at Braga and Málaga.

Born in France, Baha won 20 caps for Morocco over the course of seven years. Since July 2017, he is the second trainer of FUS Rabat.

Club career
Born in Remiremont, Vosges, and with both of his parents hailing from Douar Guerzine near Fes, Baha made his professional debuts with France's Montpellier HSC, then went on to represent Associação Naval 1º de Maio (second division) and S.C. Braga in Portugal, moving to Spain in 2005 and appearing for Racing de Ferrol in the second level. There, in spite of his eight league goals, the Galician club would be relegated.

After a brief return spell to France with lowly US Créteil-Lusitanos, Baha returned to Spain and its second tier in January 2007, scoring nine league goals for SD Ponferradina which would also drop down a level at the season's closure. In the 2007–08 campaign he played for another side in the category, Málaga CF, and, benefitting from several injuries to usual first-choice Salva, finished with ten goals (second-best in the squad) as the Andalusians returned to La Liga after two years.

In the early months of 2008, Baha was subject of a €2 million transfer to FC Steaua București, however he rejected this as he wanted to play in Spain's top flight – he had a clause in his contract allowing him to talk to other clubs if the offer was at least €5 million. In 2008–09 he scored his first goal in the competition, in a 4–0 away routing of Recreativo de Huelva on 5 October 2008; the following month he also found the net, at the Santiago Bernabéu against Real Madrid, but in a 4–3 defeat, and finished the first half of the season as the club's top scorer at eight for a total of nine, tied for best with midfielder Apoño.

On 29 January 2011, free agent Baha joined AEK Athens F.C. of Greece, signing a six-month contract with an option for an extra year. On 30 April he scored his only official goal of the campaign, in a 3–0 win against Atromitos F.C. in the Greek Cup final.

On 18 August 2011, Baha returned to Spain and joined CE Sabadell FC, signing a two-year contract. He was released by the club late in January 2013 and, in July, moved to the Chinese Super League with Dalian Aerbin FC.

International career
A full Moroccan international since February 2003, Baha took part in the 2004 Africa Cup of Nations where the national side finished second to hosts Tunisia, scoring once in a 4–0 semifinal win over Mali.

Due to a dislocated shoulder suffered in the late months of October against Racing de Santander in a Spanish Cup match, Baha failed to win a place in Morocco's final squad for the 2008 Africa Cup of Nations, which was held in Ghana.

Honors
Morocco
Africa Cup of Nations runner-up:2004

References

External links

1981 births
Living people
People from Remiremont
French sportspeople of Moroccan descent
Moroccan footballers
French footballers
Sportspeople from Vosges (department)
Footballers from Grand Est
Association football forwards
Ligue 2 players
Montpellier HSC players
US Créteil-Lusitanos players
Primeira Liga players
Liga Portugal 2 players
Segunda Divisão players
Associação Naval 1º de Maio players
S.C. Braga B players
S.C. Braga players
La Liga players
Segunda División players
Racing de Ferrol footballers
SD Ponferradina players
Málaga CF players
CE Sabadell FC footballers
Super League Greece players
AEK Athens F.C. players
Chinese Super League players
Dalian Professional F.C. players
Botola players
Fath Union Sport players
Morocco international footballers
2004 African Cup of Nations players
Moroccan expatriate footballers
French expatriate footballers
Expatriate footballers in Portugal
Expatriate footballers in Spain
Expatriate footballers in Greece
Expatriate footballers in China
Moroccan expatriate sportspeople in China
Moroccan expatriate sportspeople in Portugal
Moroccan expatriate sportspeople in Spain
French expatriate sportspeople in Greece
Moroccan expatriate sportspeople in Greece
French expatriate sportspeople in China
French expatriate sportspeople in Portugal
French expatriate sportspeople in Spain